Temper, tempered or tempering may refer to:

Heat treatment
 Tempering (metallurgy), a heat treatment technique to increase the toughness of iron-based alloys
Temper mill, a steel processing line
 Tempering (spices), a cooking technique where spices are roasted briefly in oil or ghee 
 Tempered glass, a type of safety glass processed by controlled thermal or chemical treatments
 Tempering chocolate, processing to ensure a uniform sheen and crisp bite
 Temper (pottery), a non-plastic material added to clay to prevent shrinkage during drying and firing

Arts and entertainment
 Temper (film), a 2015 Telugu film
 Temper (soundtrack), or the title track, 2015
 Temper (band), a dance music group
 Temper, a 2008 album by Benoit Pioulard 
 "Temper", a song by Cyberaktif from the 1991 album Tenebrae Vision
 "Temper", a 2021 song by Vera Blue
 Temper, or, Domestic Scenes, a novel by Amelia Opie, 1812–1813
 The Tempering, a young-adult novel by Gloria Skurzynski, 1983
 Temper, a character in Corner Shop Show

Other uses
 Temper (artist), an English graffiti artist
 Tempering (music), adjusting the musical temperament of an instrument
 Tempered distribution, in mathematics
 Tempered representation, in mathematics
 Temper, an alternate spelling of Tempel (boat), a type of native cargo boat from the Philippines

See also

 Temper Temper (disambiguation)
 Tremper (disambiguation)
 True Temper (disambiguation)
 Temperament, in psychology, consistent individual differences in behavior that are biologically based
 The Well-Tempered Clavier, a composition by Bach